Moritz Moos (born 15 March 1994) is a German rower. He won silver as part of the German team in the lightweight men's quadruple sculls at the 2013 World Rowing Championships in Chungju, Korea.  He competed in the men's lightweight double sculls event at the 2016 Summer Olympics.

References

External links
 
 
 
 

1994 births
Living people
German male rowers
Olympic rowers of Germany
Rowers at the 2016 Summer Olympics
Sportspeople from Mainz
World Rowing Championships medalists for Germany
European Rowing Championships medalists